Henry Sterns was an American bobsledder who competed in the late 1940s. He won a silver medal in the four-man event at the 1949 FIBT World Championships in Lake Placid, New York.

References
Bobsleigh four-man world championship medalists since 1930

American male bobsledders
Possibly living people
Year of birth missing